Gallerites is an extinct genus of snout moths. It was described by Kernbach in 1967, and contains the species Gallerites keleri which is known from the Pliocene. The species was discovered in Willershausen in Germany.

References

†
Fossil Lepidoptera
†
Fossils of Germany
Pliocene life
†
†